Lucy Joan Slater (5 January 1922 – 6 June 2008) was a mathematician who worked on hypergeometric functions, and who found many generalizations of the  Rogers–Ramanujan identities.

Early life 
Slater was born in 1922 and homeschooled for much of her early education. Her father passed away when she was nine years old. Slater was interested in jazz music and played the piano as an accompanist in her early years. She attended college at Bedford College and received her first B.A. from London University in 1944. During the war, she worked teaching soldiers trigonometry.

Career 
Her advisor was Wilfrid Norman Bailey. She received an M.A. and Ph.D from London University while studying hypergeometric equations, including her publication of a list of over 100 Rogers-Ramanujan Identities. Later, she received a D.Litt. from London University as well. In the early 1950s she played a leading role at Cambridge University in devising a precursor of modern computer operating systems, and subsequently she helped to develop computer programs for econometrics, working for much of the time with UK government officials. She received a Ph.D. and Sc.D. from Cambridge and was named Assistant Director of Research in the Department of Economics in 1962.

She retired in 1982 and subsequently devoted much of her time to genealogy.

Writing 
Her (unpublished) memoirs include descriptions of life as a teenager in Portsmouth during the bombing of the Second World War, and of working with early computers at Cambridge. In 1997 she completed a remarkable listing of all the graves at the Parish of the Ascension Burial Ground in Cambridge and their inscriptions in the burial ground; she wrote a paper called "A Walk round the Ascension Burial Ground, Cambridge" which describes over 100 of the graves as though the reader is walking around the burial ground and includes detailed maps. The fourth edition is dated December 1994.

Death 
She was buried at the Parish of the Ascension Burial Ground in Cambridge in 2008 in the same grave as her mother, Lucy Dalton Slater (1893–1975), widow of John Wardle Slater F.I.C., Admiralty chemist, buried in Portsmouth.

Recognition 
In 2016 the Council of the University of Cambridge approved the use of Slater's name to mark a physical feature within the North West Cambridge Development.

Publications
 
 
 
 
  (there is a 2008 paperback with )
 Fortran programs for economists, Cambridge University Press, 1967
 First steps in basic Fortran, London: Chapman & Hall, 1971
 More Fortran programs for economists, Cambridge University Press, 1972
 GEM: a general econometric matrix program, Cambridge University Press, 1976
 Dynamic regression: theory and algorithms (co-author with M. H. Pesaran), Halsted Press, 1980

See also
 Timeline of women in mathematics

References

External links
 
 

20th-century British mathematicians
21st-century British mathematicians
British women mathematicians
2008 deaths
1922 births
20th-century British women scientists
20th-century women mathematicians
21st-century women mathematicians
Alumni of the University of London